Mawlānā Moavia Azam Tariq is a Pakistani far-right politician who had been a member of the Provincial Assembly of the Punjab from August 2018 till January 2023.

Early life 
Hw was born on 28 August 1983 in Chichawatni and in 2006, He obtained the degree of Master of Arts in Islamic Studies from Zakariyya International Islamic University in South Africa.

Political career

He was elected to the Provincial Assembly of the Punjab as a candidate of Pakistan Rah-e-Haq Party from Constituency PP-126 (Jhang-III) in the 2018 Punjab provincial election. 

He received 65,252 votes and defeated an independent candidate, Sheikh Sheraz Akram. Following his election, he joined Pakistan Rah-e-Haq. 

His father Maulana Azam Tariq was also a member of the national assembly.

He is also a member of the Ahle Sunnat Wal Jamaat.

References

Living people
Pakistani prisoners and detainees
Punjab MPAs 2018–2023
Pakistani Islamists
Pakistani politicians convicted of crimes
Pakistani far-right politicians
Deobandis
1983 births